Tingo is a district of Luya Province in Peru. It borders with Colcamar to the north, Levanto and Magdalena districts of Chachapoyas Province to the east, San Juan de Lopecancha to the southeast, and Longuita to the west.

External links
Tingo district official website

Districts of the Luya Province
Districts of the Amazonas Region